Christian Victor Noel Hope Hely-Hutchinson (26 December 1901 –  11 March 1947) was a British composer, conductor, pianist and music administrator. He is best known for the Carol Symphony and for humorous song-settings.

Early life 
Hely-Hutchinson was born in Cape Town, Cape Colony (now Cape Town, South Africa). His parents were Sir Walter Hely-Hutchinson, Governor of Cape Colony from 1901 to 1910 during and after the Boer War, and May Hely-Hutchinson. He initially lived in Kent, then moved back to South Africa in 1907. He was taught the piano by Dr Thomas Barrow Dowling (1861–1926), the organist of Cape Town cathedral. Victor was a child prodigy, composing many pieces before the age of ten – his parents had a collection of sketches for violin and piano published as A Child's Thoughts in 1909. 

In England in 1910, he was taught piano by Donald Tovey and was initially educated at Heatherdown School, near Ascot in Berkshire. In 1914, his father died. Victor was then educated at Eton College, and then read history at Balliol College, Oxford. Music, however, prevailed and after one year at Oxford he was granted permission to study for a Mus. Bac. at the Royal College of Music, where he studied conducting under Adrian Boult. In 1922, he returned to Cape Town to teach at the South African College of Music, which was later incorporated into the University of Cape Town.

Later life 
He joined the BBC at Savoy Hill in 1926, becoming a conductor, pianist, and accompanist. He moved to Hampstead, where his two sons were born. In 1933, he moved once again to Birmingham to become Midland Regional Director of Music for the BBC, where he formed and conducted the Midland Studio Orchestra. In 1934, he left the BBC to become Professor of Music at the University of Birmingham, taking over from Sir Granville Bantock. 

In 1938, he saw signs of war, and relocated his family out of Birmingham to a nearby village. During the war he became an ARP warden. He became a D.Mus from Oxford University in 1941. He also joined the university's officer cadet force. In 1944, he returned to the BBC to become overall Director of Music, succeeding Arthur Bliss. He moved to St John's Wood. He never purchased a car, always using his bicycle.

The winter of 1947 was very long-lasting and to save fuel (which was still rationed), Hely-Hutchinson refused to switch on the radiators in his office. He developed a cold, which became pneumonia.

Death
He died on 11 March 1947 at the premature age of 45. His wife Marjorie died in 1988. Astra Desmond sang at his memorial service.

Works 
Although mostly forgotten now, Hely-Hutchinson's orchestral music enjoyed some popularity during his lifetime, including the Overture to a Pantomime, and the substantial Variations, Intermezzo and Finale, (described by the composer as a set of symphonic variations) premiered at the Proms in 1927. The Young Idea, a lighter, jazz-influenced rhapsody for piano and orchestra, was also played at the Proms in 1930 and was recorded in 2008 with the BBC Concert Orchestra and David Owen Norris as soloist. A Symphony for small orchestra, using music reworked from some of his film scores, was heard posthumously at the Proms in 1947.

By far his best known work is the Carol Symphony written in 1927. The four movements - really chorale preludes rather than symphonic movements - are based on the traditional English Christmas carols: 
 O Come, All Ye Faithful
 God Rest You Merry, Gentlemen
 The Coventry Carol and The First Nowell
 Here We Come A-wassailing

The third movement was used for the title music of the 1943 Children's Hour and 1984 BBC children's television adaptation of John Masefield's The Box of Delights, in particular the variation on the theme of The First Nowell.

He remains well known for his settings of various nursery rhymes and children's poems. His setting of "Old Mother Hubbard" is arranged in the manner of Handel. His song setting of Edward Lear's "The Owl and the Pussycat" was notably recorded in 1955 by Elton Hayes and featured regularly on the BBC's Children's Favourites radio show.

Songs 

With texts by William Blake
Five Songs of Innocence
Piping down the valleys wild 
The Lamb
Infant Joy
Spring
The Little Boy Lost
The Echoing Green and Other Songs
The Echoing Green
The Shepherd
Laughing Song
Holy Thursday
The Blossom
A Cradle Song

With texts by Edward Lear
Three Nonsense Songs
The Owl and the Pussy-cat
The Table and the Chair
The Duck and the Kangaroo

With texts by Harry Graham
Twenty-one songs from "Ruthless Rhymes for Heartless Homes" (1945)
More Ruthless Rhymes for Heartless Homes (1946)

With texts by Walter de la Mare
Three Songs from "Peacock Pie"
The cupboard
The window
The little old Cupid
Song of a Soldier (1933)

Orchestral 
 Three Fugal Fancies, for strings (1925)
 Carol Symphony (1927)
 Variations, Intermezzo and Finale for orchestra (1927)
 The Young Idea: Rhapsody for piano and orchestra (1930)
 Overture to a Pantomime (1938)
 Symphony for Small Orchestra (1942)
 Solemn Prelude, in G
 South African Suite

Dramatic 
 Hearts are Trumps (Operetta) (1932)
 The Unveiling (Nativity play) (1932)
 Much incidental music for plays, theatre and radio

Chamber 
 Piano Quintet
 Piano Sonata
 String Quartet
 Viola Sonata
 Violin Sonata

Bibliography 
 Jürgen Schaarwächter, Two Centuries of British Symphonism: From the beginnings to 1945. A preliminary survey, Vol. I, pp. 564–565, Georg Olms Verlag, Hildesheim-Zurich-New York, 2015.
 Artist Biography by Bruce Eder, Allmusic.com
 Mark Connelly, Christmas: A History, I. B. Tauris, London New York, 2012.
 Benjamin Britten, Letters from a Life Vol 1: 1923-39, Edited by Donald Mitchell.

References

External links 
 MusicWeb biography
 Biography
 

Academics of the University of Birmingham
People educated at Eton College
Alumni of Balliol College, Oxford
Alumni of the Royal College of Music
1901 births
1947 deaths
Academic staff of the University of Cape Town
Deaths from pneumonia in England
Musicians from Cape Town
People educated at Heatherdown School
South African composers
South African male composers
20th-century classical musicians
20th-century English composers
Victor
20th-century British male musicians
British composers
British conductors (music)
British pianists
BBC Orchestras
BBC music executives